A system is a set of entities, real or abstract, comprising a whole.

System may also refer to:

Science and technology
 Biological system, a complex network of biological entities, for instance, a group of organs
 Ecosystem, an entity comprising a large number of organisms and their environment
 Energy system, an interpretation of the energy sector in system terms
 Binary system (disambiguation), term is used for multiple purposes, such as:
 Binary system (astronomy), a system of two celestial bodies on a mutual orbit
 Star or stellar system, is a system of any multiple number of stars
 Planetary system, gravitationally bound non-stellar objects in or out of orbit around a star or star system
 Satellite system (astronomy), is a set of gravitationally bound non-planetary objects in orbit of a planetary mass object or minor planet, or its barycenter
 Ring system, is a system of cosmic dust or moonlets, forming rings around, and gravitationally bound to a host non-stellar body.
 Physical system, that portion of the physical universe chosen for analysis
 Thermodynamic system, a body of matter and/or radiation, confined in space by walls, with defined permeabilities, which separate it from its surroundings
 Systems science, an interdisciplinary field that studies the nature of complex systems in nature, society, and science
 System (stratigraphy), a unit of the geologic record of a rock column
 Systems engineering, a field about design, integration, and management of complex systems
 System of equations, a set of mathematical equations

Computing
 Computer system, the combination of hardware and software which forms a complete, working computer
 Operating system
 system, a C process control function in the C Standard Library used to execute subprocesses and commands
 System (typeface), a raster font packaged with Microsoft Windows

Social science
 Economic system, covering the production and distribution of goods and services
 Social system, based on the interrelationships between individuals, groups, and institutions

Music
 System (music notation), a collection of staves to be played simultaneously
 System (Seal album), a 2007 album by Seal
 "System", a song by Jonathan Davis on his 2007 album Alone I Play
 "System", a song by Labelle on their 2008 album Back to Now
 "System", a song by Reks on his 2009 album More Grey Hairs
 System, a Danish electronic trio consisting of Anders Remmer, Jesper Skaaning, and Thomas Knak
 System of a Down, an Armenian-American heavy metal band also known as "System"

Other uses
 System (journal), a scientific journal
 System (magazine)
 When talking about plurality or multiplicity, "system" can be used to refer to all personas (or "headmates") present in a single body, taken together as a group.

See also
 Classic Mac OS versions 1 through 7 were known as "System 1" through "System 7"
 Meta-system, something composed of multiple smaller systems
 The System (disambiguation)
 Systematics (disambiguation)
 Systema (disambiguation)
 List of systems
 Government
 Law
 Bureaucracy